Kelvin Monteiro Medina, known as Zimbabwe (born 3 January 1994), is a Cape Verdean professional footballer who plays as a midfielder for the Portuguese club Sporting da Covilhã.

Club career
On 2 July 2021, he signed a contract with Rio Ave for a term of one year with two optional years.

International career
Medina made his debut for the Cape Verde national football team in a 0-0 (4-3) penalty shootout win over Andorra on 3 June 2018.

References

External links
 
 
 FPF Profile

1994 births
People from Mindelo
Living people
Cape Verdean footballers
Cape Verde international footballers
Association football midfielders
Sertanense F.C. players
SC Mirandela players
U.D. Vilafranquense players
Académico de Viseu F.C. players
Rio Ave F.C. players
S.C. Covilhã players
Liga Portugal 2 players
Campeonato de Portugal (league) players
Cape Verdean expatriate footballers
Expatriate footballers in Portugal
Cape Verdean expatriate sportspeople in Portugal